The Terracotta Army is a collection of terracotta sculptures depicting the armies of Qin Shi Huang, the first emperor of China. It is a form of funerary art buried with the emperor in 210–209 BCE with the purpose of protecting the emperor in his afterlife.

The figures, dating from approximately the late third century BCE, were discovered in 1974 by local farmers in Lintong County, outside Xi'an, Shaanxi, China. The figures vary in height according to their roles, the tallest being the generals. The figures include warriors, chariots and horses. Estimates from 2007 were that the three pits containing the Terracotta Army held more than 8,000 soldiers, 130 chariots with 520 horses, and 150 cavalry horses, the majority of which remained buried in the pits near Qin Shi Huang's mausoleum. Other terracotta non-military figures were found in other pits, including officials, acrobats, strongmen, and musicians.

History 

The construction of the tomb was described by historian Sima Qian (14590 BCE) in Records of the Grand Historian, the first of China's 24 dynastic histories, which was written a century after the mausoleum's completion.  Work on the mausoleum began in 246 BCE soon after Emperor Qin (then aged 13) ascended the throne, and the project eventually involved 700,000 conscripted workers. Geographer Li Daoyuan, writing six centuries after the first emperor's death, recorded in Shui Jing Zhu that Mount Li was a favoured location due to its auspicious geology: "famed for its jade mines, its northern side was rich in gold, and its southern side rich in beautiful jade; the first emperor, covetous of its fine reputation, therefore chose to be buried there". Sima Qian wrote that the first emperor was buried with palaces, towers, officials, valuable artifacts and wondrous objects. According to this account, 100 flowing rivers were simulated using mercury, and above them the ceiling was decorated with heavenly bodies, below which were the features of the land. Some translations of this passage refer to "models" or "imitations"; however, those words were not used in the original text, which makes no mention of the terracotta army. High levels of mercury were found in the soil of the tomb mound, giving credence to Sima Qian's account. Later historical accounts suggested that the complex and tomb itself had been looted by Xiang Yu, a contender for the throne after the death of the first emperor. However, there are indications that the tomb itself may not have been plundered.

Discovery 
For centuries, occasional reports mentioned pieces of terracotta figures and fragments of the Qin necropolis – roofing tiles, bricks and chunks of masonry. This discovery prompted Chinese archaeologists, including Zhao Kangmin, to investigate, revealing the largest pottery figurine group ever found. A museum complex has since been constructed over the area, the largest pit being enclosed by a roofed structure.

Necropolis 

The Terracotta Army is part of a much larger necropolis.  Ground-penetrating radar and core sampling have measured the area to be approximately 98 square kilometers (38 square miles).

The necropolis was constructed as a microcosm of the emperor's imperial palace or compound, and covers a large area around the tomb mound of the first emperor. The earthen tomb mound is located at the foot of Mount Li and built in a pyramidal shape, and is surrounded by two solidly built rammed earth walls with gateway entrances. The necropolis consists of several offices, halls, stables, other structures as well as an imperial park placed around the tomb mound.

The warriors stand guard to the east of the tomb. During the excavations near the Mount Li burial mound, archaeologists found several graves dating from the 18th and 19th centuries, where diggers had apparently struck terracotta fragments. These were discarded as worthless and used along with soil to backfill the excavations.

Tomb 

The tomb appears to be a hermetically sealed space roughly the size of a football pitch (c. 100 × 75 m). The tomb remains unopened, possibly due to concerns over preservation of its artifacts. For example, after the excavation of the Terracotta Army, the painted surface present on some terracotta figures began to flake and fade. The lacquer covering the paint can curl in fifteen seconds once exposed to Xi'an's dry air and can flake off in just four minutes.

Excavation site

Pits 

The soldiers within were laid out as if to protect the tomb from the east, where the Qin Emperor's conquered states lay.

Pit 1
This design was also used for the tombs of nobles and would have resembled palace hallways when built.

Others 

Pit 2 has cavalry and infantry units as well as war chariots and is thought to represent a military guard. Pit 3 is the command post, with high-ranking officers and a war chariot. Pit 4 is empty, perhaps left unfinished by its builders.

Some of the figures in Pits 1 and 2 show fire damage, while remains of burnt ceiling rafters have also been found. These, together with the missing weapons, have been taken as evidence of the reported looting by Xiang Yu and the subsequent burning of the site, which is thought to have caused the roof to collapse and crush the army figures below. The terracotta figures currently on display have been restored from the fragments.

Other pits that formed the necropolis have also been excavated. These pits lie within and outside the walls surrounding the tomb mound. They variously contain bronze carriages, terracotta figures of entertainers such as acrobats and strongmen, officials, stone armour suits, burial sites of horses, rare animals and labourers, as well as bronze cranes and ducks set in an underground park.

Warrior figures

Types and appearance

They vary in height, uniform, and hairstyle in accordance with rank. Their faces appear to be different for each individual figure; scholars, however, have identified 10 basic face shapes. The figures are of these general types: armored infantry; unarmored infantry; cavalrymen who wear a pillbox hat; helmeted drivers of chariots with more armor protection; spear-carrying charioteers; kneeling crossbowmen or archers who are armored; standing archers who are not; as well as generals and other lower-ranking officers. There are, however, many variations in the uniforms within the ranks: for example, some may wear shin pads while others not; they may wear either long or short trousers, some of which may be padded; and their body armors vary depending on rank, function, and position in formation. There are also terracotta horses placed among the warrior figures.

Originally, the figures were painted with: ground precious stones, intensely fired bones (white), pigments of iron oxide (dark red), cinnabar (red), malachite (green), azurite (blue), charcoal (black), cinnabar barium copper silicate mix (Chinese purple or Han purple),  tree sap from a nearby source, (more than likely from the Chinese lacquer tree) (brown). Other colors including pink, lilac, red, white, and one unidentified color. The colored lacquer finish and individual facial features would have given the figures a realistic feel, with eyebrows and facial hair in black and the faces done in pink.

However, in Xi'an's dry climate, much of the color coating would flake off in less than four minutes after removing the mud surrounding the army.

Since the time of their discovery, the figures have been noted for their exceptional stylistic realism and individualism, with assessments having found that no two figures share the exact same features. The earliest note on this aspect was that of 20th century art historian German Hafner who, in 1986, was the first to speculate on a possible Hellenistic link to these sculptures due to the unusual display of naturalism relative to general Qin era sculpture. However, this idea has been disputed by scholars citing "no substantial evidence at all" for contact between ancient Greeks and Chinese builders of the tomb, and contending that the bases of such speculation are often imprecise or false interpretations of source materials or far-fetched conjectures. They argue that such speculations rest on flawed and old "Eurocentric" ideas that assumed other civilizations were incapable of sophisticated artistry and thus foreign artistry must be seen through Western traditions. Recent morphological studies finding a high degree of resemblance of the statues in facial features with the region’s modern inhabitants have led some scholars to alternatively theorize that the degree of stylistic realism stems from the figures being modelled off of actual soldiers. These findings have lent support to a hypothesis that the sculptural naturalism derives from a Qin funerary tradition to realistically duplicate possessions for the underworld, which in the case of the first emperor, extended to his soldiery.

Construction

The terracotta army figures were manufactured in workshops by government laborers and local craftsmen using local materials. Heads, arms, legs, and torsos were created separately and then assembled by luting the pieces together. When completed, the terracotta figures were placed in the pits in precise military formation according to rank and duty.

The faces were created using molds, and at least ten face molds may have been used. Clay was then added after assembly to provide individual facial features to make each figure appear different. It is believed that the warriors' legs were made in much the same way that terracotta drainage pipes were manufactured at the time. This would classify the process as assembly line production, with specific parts manufactured and assembled after being fired, as opposed to crafting a figure as one solid piece and subsequently firing it. In those times of tight imperial control, each workshop was required to inscribe its name on items produced to ensure quality control. This has aided modern historians in verifying which workshops were commandeered to make tiles and other mundane items for the terracotta army.

Weaponry 

Most of the figures originally held real weapons, which would have increased their realism. The majority of these weapons were looted shortly after the creation of the army or have rotted away.  Despite this, over 40,000 bronze items of weaponry have been recovered, including swords, daggers, spears, lances, battle-axes, scimitars, shields, crossbows, and crossbow triggers. Most of the recovered items are arrowheads, which are usually found in bundles of 100 units. Studies of these arrowheads suggests that they were produced by self-sufficient, autonomous workshops using a process referred to as cellular production or Toyotism. Some weapons were coated with a 10–15 micrometer layer of chromium dioxide before burial that was believed to have protected them from any form of decay for the last 2200 years. However, research in 2019 indicated that the chromium was merely contamination from nearby lacquer, not a means of protecting the weapons. The slightly alkaline pH and small particle size of the burial soil most likely preserved the weapons.

The swords contain an alloy of copper, tin, and other elements including nickel, magnesium, and cobalt. Some carry inscriptions that date their manufacture to between 245 and 228 BCE, indicating that they were used before burial.

Scientific research 

In 2007, scientists at Stanford University and the Advanced Light Source facility in Berkeley, California, reported that powder diffraction experiments combined with energy-dispersive X-ray spectroscopy and micro-X-ray fluorescence analysis showed that the process of producing terracotta figures colored with Chinese purple dye consisting of barium copper silicate was derived from the knowledge gained by Taoist alchemists in their attempts to synthesize jade ornaments.

Since 2006, an international team of researchers at the UCL Institute of Archaeology have been using analytical chemistry techniques to uncover more details about the production techniques employed in the creation of the Terracotta Army. Using X-ray fluorescence spectrometry of 40,000 bronze arrowheads bundled in groups of 100, the researchers reported that the arrowheads within a single bundle formed a relatively tight cluster that was different from other bundles. In addition, the presence or absence of metal impurities was consistent within bundles. Based on the arrows’ chemical compositions, the researchers concluded that a cellular manufacturing system similar to the one used in a modern Toyota factory, as opposed to a continuous assembly line in the early days of the automobile industry, was employed.

Grinding and polishing marks visible under a scanning electron microscope provide evidence for the earliest industrial use of lathes for polishing.

Exhibitions 

The first exhibition of the figures outside of China was held at National Gallery of Victoria (NGV) in Melbourne in 1982.

A collection of 120 objects from the mausoleum and 12 terracotta warriors were displayed at the British Museum in London as its special exhibition "The First Emperor: China's Terracotta Army" from 13 September 2007 to April 2008. This exhibition made 2008 the British Museum's most successful year and made the British Museum the United Kingdom's top cultural attraction between 2007 and 2008. The exhibition brought the most visitors to the museum since the King Tutankhamun exhibition in 1972. It was reported that the 400,000 advance tickets sold out so fast that the museum extended its opening hours until midnight. According to The Times, many people had to be turned away, despite the extended hours.  During the day of events to mark the Chinese New Year, the crush was so intense that the gates to the museum had to be shut. The Terracotta Army has been described as the only other set of historic artifacts (along with the remnants of the wreck of the RMS Titanic) that can draw a crowd by the name alone.

Warriors and other artifacts were exhibited to the public at the Forum de Barcelona in Barcelona between 9 May and 26 September 2004. It was their most successful exhibition ever. The same exhibition was presented at the Fundación Canal de Isabel II in Madrid between October 2004 and January 2005, their most successful ever. From December 2009 to May 2010, the exhibition was shown in the Centro Cultural La Moneda in Santiago de Chile.

The exhibition traveled to North America and visited museums such as the Asian Art Museum of San Francisco, Bowers Museum in Santa Ana, California, Houston Museum of Natural Science, High Museum of Art in Atlanta, National Geographic Society Museum in Washington, D.C. and the Royal Ontario Museum in Toronto. Subsequently, the exhibition traveled to Sweden and was hosted in the Museum of Far Eastern Antiquities between 28 August 2010 and 20 January 2011. An exhibition entitled 'The First Emperor – China's Entombed Warriors', presenting 120 artifacts was hosted at the Art Gallery of New South Wales, between 2 December 2010 and 13 March 2011. An exhibition entitled "L'Empereur guerrier de Chine et son armée de terre cuite" ("The Warrior-Emperor of China and his terracotta army"), featuring artifacts including statues from the mausoleum, was hosted by the Montreal Museum of Fine Arts from 11 February 2011 to 26 June 2011. In Italy, from July 2008 to 16 November 2008, five of the warriors of the terracotta army were displayed in Turin at the Museum of Antiquities, and from 16 April 2010 to 5 September 2010 nine statues were displayed at the Royal Palace in Milan at the exhibition entitled "The Two Empires". The group consisted of a horse, a counselor, an archer and six lancers. The "Treasures of Ancient China" exhibition, showcasing two terracotta soldiers and other artifacts, including the Longmen Grottoes Buddhist statues, was held between 19 February 2011 and 7 November 2011 in four locations in India: National Museum of New Delhi, Prince of Wales Museum in Mumbai, Salar Jung Museum in Hyderabad and National Library of India in Kolkata.

Soldiers and related items were on display from 15 March 2013 to 17 November 2013, at the Historical Museum of Bern.

Several Terracotta Army figures were on display, along with many other objects, in an exhibit entitled "Age of Empires: Chinese Art of the Qin and Han Dynasties" at The Metropolitan Museum of Art in New York City from 3 April 2017, to 16 July 2017. An exhibition featuring ten Terracotta Army figures and other artifacts, "Terracotta Warriors of the First Emperor," was on display at the Pacific Science Center in Seattle, Washington, from 8 April 2017 to 4 September 2017 before traveling to The Franklin Institute in Philadelphia, Pennsylvania, to be exhibited from 30 September 2017 to 4 March 2018 with the addition of augmented reality.

An exhibition entitled "China's First Emperor and the Terracotta Warriors" was at the World Museum in Liverpool from 9 February 2018 to 28 October 2018. This was the first time in more than 10 years that the warriors travelled to the UK.

An exhibition tour of 120 real-size replicas of Terracotta statues was displayed in the German cities of Frankfurt am Main, Munich, Oberhof, Berlin (at the Palace of the Republic) and Nuremberg between 2003 and 2004.

Gallery

See also
 List of World Heritage Sites in China
 Qin bronze chariot

Notes

Bibliography

External links

 UNESCO description of the Mausoleum of the First Qin Emperor
 Emperor Qinshihuang's Mausoleum Site Museum (official website)
 People's Daily article on the Terracotta Army
 OSGFilms Video Article : Terracotta Warriors at Discovery Times Square
 Tomb of the First Emperor of China by Professor Anthony Barbieri, UCSB
 China's Terracotta Warriors  Documentary produced by the PBS Series Secrets of the Dead

Archaeology of China
Infantry units and formations
Military and war museums in China
Archaeological museums in China
Qin dynasty
World Heritage Sites in China
Tourist attractions in Xi'an
Terracotta sculptures
1974 archaeological discoveries
Museums in Xi'an
AAAAA-rated tourist attractions
Military art
Funerary art
Qin Shi Huang
1974 in China
National first-grade museums of China